The Amazing Mr. X, also known as The Spiritualist, is a 1948 American horror thriller film noir directed by Bernard Vorhaus with cinematography by John Alton. The film tells the story of a phony spiritualist racket. The film is prominently featured in Alton's book on cinematography Painting with Light (1949).

The film stars Turhan Bey, Lynn Bari, Cathy O'Donnell, and Richard Carlson. Eagle-Lion Films signed a contract with Carole Landis for the part played by Bari, but Landis committed suicide a few days before filming began. The film is in the public domain.

Plot

Christine Faber (Lynn Bari) awakes one night to the sound of her late husband's voice calling out. She walks outside her beachfront home to investigate. There, she encounters a stranger named Alexis (Turhan Bey), a mysterious spiritualist who seems to know all about her. She hears her late husband's favorite musical composition, Frédéric Chopin's Fourth Prelude from Opus. 28 in E minor, and is unnerved by it. After more nights of eerie vocal manifestations, Christine and her younger sister Janet (Cathy O'Donnell) decide to consult Alexis. Over time, they become enmeshed in Alexis's strange life. One evening, he stages a surprisingly convincing séance for the two women. After they leave, however, he is surprised by the appearance of Christine's dead husband, Paul Faber, alive and well. It turns out that Paul (Donald Curtis) had faked his own death two years earlier. Having now returned, he schemes for ways to dispatch Christine in order to get his hands on her wealth. He begins by blackmailing the crooked Alexis into continuing his con of the two sisters.

One evening, while Alexis romances young Janet just outside the beach house, Christine hears Paul's mysterious voice again. Just as before, she exits her bedroom to search outside but falls partway down a cliff and is ultimately saved by Alexis. Her fiancé, Martin (Richard Carlson), urges Christine to leave her house for safety and stay in a hospital. Christine refuses, helplessly entranced by the recurring voice of Paul. Later, Janet suspects something fishy in Paul's "visitations." And sure enough, when Paul's voice is heard again, Janet searches the beach house and discovers both Alexis and Paul concealed in a small room with microphones, wire recordings, and other tricks of the spiritualist con game. Paul threatens Janet with a pistol, but Alexis tries to protect her from harm. While doing so, he is fatally shot by Paul. The police arrive. Paul shoots at them; but the cops return fire. This time, Paul dies.

Cast
 Turhan Bey as Alexis
 Lynn Bari as Christine Faber
 Cathy O'Donnell as Janet Burke
 Richard Carlson as Martin Abbott
 Donald Curtis as Paul Faber
 Virginia Gregg as Emily
 Harry Mendoza as Detective Hoffman

Production
The film was known as The Spiritualist. It was an original story by Crane Wilbur and was bought by Producers Releasing Corporation in 1947, with Wilbur slated to direct.

Eventually the project was acquired by Eagle-Lion Films as a vehicle for Turhan Bey, who was under contract to the studio. Bernard Vorhaus was to direct and Muriel Bolton to adapt the story into a script. Vorhaus did the film under a two-picture deal he signed with Eagle-Lion. The other lead roles went to Lynn Bari and Cathy O'Donnell; the latter was borrowed from Sam Goldwyn.
 
Wilbur would go on to become one of Eagle-Lion's main writers. Vorhaus later said he was unhappy with the script, however, and asked for a rewrite. He says producer Ben Stoloff allowed him to hire Ian McLellan Hunter, who rewrote the script in a week.

Filming started 5 January 1948. Vorhaus says the shoot went for three weeks.

Turhan Bey later recalled the film as "a fantastic role with wonderful people to work with and a lovely death scene I completely loused up... I just wish all my roles had been as interesting as that one."

At one stage the film was also known as The Mystic.

Reception
At previews, audiences found parts of the film to be funny, resulting in unintended laughter.

Eagle Lion were happy with the film. However, when Vorhaus turned down the next movie they offered him, I Married a Communist, the company terminated its association with him.

See also
 List of films in the public domain in the United States

Notes

References

External links 

 
 
 
 
 

1948 films
1948 horror films
American black-and-white films
1940s English-language films
Films directed by Bernard Vorhaus
American independent films
1940s horror thriller films
Eagle-Lion Films films
Articles containing video clips
American horror thriller films
1940s American films